Ilex pallida is a species of plant in the family Aquifoliaceae. It is found in El Salvador, Honduras, Nicaragua, Costa Rica, and Panama. It is threatened by habitat loss.

Description
Ilex pallida is a shrub or small- to medium-sized tree, growing from 2 to 20 meters tall. It flowers from January to July and November, and fruits from March to December.

Range and habitat
Ilex pallida grows in humid mountain forests in central America, from El Salvador and southern Honduras through Nicaragua and Costa Rica to western Panama. It grows between 700 and 3,300 meters elevation.

It is found in humid premontane and montane forests, including montane rainforests, cloud forests, and oak forests.

References

pallida
Vulnerable plants
Flora of Costa Rica
Flora of El Salvador
Flora of Honduras
Flora of Nicaragua
Flora of Panama
Taxonomy articles created by Polbot
Flora of the Central American montane forests
Flora of the Talamancan montane forests
Plants described in 1926